The Stupids are a fictional family which appear in a series of children's books written by Harry Allard and James Marshall. The Stupids draw their humor from the fact that they are incompetent to the point of confusing the most simple concepts and tasks.

Controversy
The Stupids series of books rank number 62 on the American Library Association's list of 100 Most Frequently Challenged Books of the entire 2000's decade. Challengers of the books claim that they describe families in a derogatory manner and may encourage children to be disobedient. They also claim that they promote low self-esteem and negative behavior.

Books in the series 
 The Stupids Step Out (1974)
 The Stupids Have a Ball (1978)
 The Stupids Die (1981)
 The Stupids Take Off (1989)

Film version 

In 1996, a film version was released starring Tom Arnold, directed by John Landis; It was a box office disappointment. The film details the family's pursuit of their trash, which they believe to be stolen, and the "conspiracy" they uncover in the process. The film was also panned by many film critics.

References 

American picture books
Fictional families
Literary characters introduced in 1974
Houghton Mifflin books